Paolo Buzzi (15 February 1874, Milan – 18 February 1956) was an Italian futurist playwright and poet.

Biography
Buzzi studied law in Pavia, and at the same time attended lectures in literature. In 1891, he won the milanese Concorso di Poesia award. In 1898 with Rapsodie leopardiane his poetry career begun in ernest. In 1905 he won the title of Best Italian Language Poet in a competition in the literary magazine Poesia, founded by Marinetti and Sem Benelli. He started thus to write for Poesia, and became a noted futurist, experimenting with poetical and theatrical form. He also tried filming. In later years he left the futurist work ethos and worked with traditional forms of poetry.

Works

Poesie leopardiane 1898, Galli e Raimondi, Milan
L'esilio, 1906, Galli e Raimondi, Milan
Aeroplani, 1909, Edizioni di "Poesia", Milan
Versi liberi Treves, 1913, Milan
L'Elisse e la spirale, 1915, Edizioni di "Poesia", Milan
Bel canto", 1916, Studio Editoriale, Lombardo 
Popolo, canta così! 1920, Facchi, Milan
Poema dei quarantanni, 1922, Edizioni di "Poesia", Milan
Canti per le chiese vuote, 1930, Foligno Campitelli
Poema di radioonde, 1940
Atomiche, 1950

1874 births
1956 deaths
Writers from Milan
Futurist theatre
Futurist writers
Italian Futurism
Modernist theatre
19th-century Italian writers
19th-century Italian male writers
20th-century Italian writers
20th-century Italian male writers